Acra or ACRA may refer to:

Abbreviation (ACRA) 
 Accounting and Corporate Regulatory Authority 
 All-Channel Receiver Act
 American Car Rental Association
 American Collegiate Rowing Association
 Analytical Credit Rating Agency of Russia
 Arwarbukarl Cultural Resource Association
 ACTRA
 Australian Cultivar Registration Authority
 Acriflavine resistance protein A  encode a multi-drug efflux system of bacteria

Places 
 Acra (fortress) (2nd century BC), a Seleucid fortified compound in Jerusalem; late Second Temple residential area in Jerusalem
 Ptolemaic Acra or Ptolemaic Baris (3rd century BC), a Ptolemaic citadel in Jerusalem

United States
 Acra, New York, a hamlet located within the town of Cairo, New York

People 
 Reem Acra, Lebanese fashion designer

See also 
 Aakra or Åkra (disambiguation)
 Accra, the capital of Ghana
 Acre (disambiguation)
 Akra (disambiguation)
 Akre (disambiguation)
 Aqra (disambiguation)